Denemo is a scorewriter and music sequencer. Denemo has been under development since 1999.

Denemo helps prepare notation for publishing and lets a user rapidly enter notation, simultaneously typesetting via the LilyPond music engraver. Music can be typed in using a PC keyboard, taken from MIDI input, or played into a microphone plugged into a soundcard. The program plays back via an internal sampler and can act as a JACK/MIDI client. Denemo includes scripts to run music tests and practice exercises for educational purposes.

Features 
Denemo can output entire scores (including Table of Contents and Critical Commentary automatically generated from comments placed in the music) as well as excerpts in a number of formats, including:
 LilyPond files (.ly)
 MusicXML files (.musicxml)
 PDF files
 MIDI files
 WAV, OGG audio files
 PNG graphic files

The program allows the user to place links in the music to original source manuscripts/prints (in PDF files) allowing cross-checking of transcriptions. It also allows audio recordings to be linked to a notated score with synchronization via automatically detected note-onsets; the notated score and audio are played back simultaneously and can be slowed down in real time to listen for discrepancies.

Denemo has all the music notation functions accessible via keyboard shortcuts.  However, everything can be accessed by mouse, and both one- and two- key keyboard shortcuts can be created easily by the user for the task at hand. WYSIWYG manipulations can be performed in the typeset view, e.g. interactively re-shaping slurs. A Scheme scripting interface is also available, and commands written in Scheme can be placed in the menu system or dockable palettes.

See also
 List of music software

References

LilyPond
Free music software
Audio software that uses GTK
Scorewriters
MIDI
Scorewriters for Linux